Varu is a village in Mawal taluka of Pune district in the state of Maharashtra, India.

Administration
The village is administrated by a sarpanch, an elected representative who leads a gram panchayat. In 2019, the village was not itself listed as a seat of a gram panchayat, meaning that the local administration was shared with one or more other villages.

Demographics
At the 2011 Census of India, the village comprised 143 households. The population of 971 was split between 489 males and 482 females.

See also
List of villages in Mawal taluka

References

Villages in Mawal taluka